Daniel Kahneman (born March 5, 1934) is an Israeli-American psychologist and economist notable for his work on the psychology of judgment and decision-making, as well as behavioral economics, for which he was awarded the 2002 Nobel Memorial Prize in Economic Sciences (shared with Vernon L. Smith). His empirical findings challenge the assumption of human rationality prevailing in modern economic theory.

With Amos Tversky and others, Kahneman established a cognitive basis for common human errors that arise from heuristics and biases, and developed prospect theory.

In 2011 he was named by Foreign Policy magazine in its list of top global thinkers. In the same year his book Thinking, Fast and Slow, which summarizes much of his research, was published and became a best seller. In 2015, The Economist listed him as the seventh most influential economist in the world.

He is professor emeritus of psychology and public affairs at Princeton University's Princeton School of Public and International Affairs. Kahneman is a founding partner of TGG Group, a business and philanthropy consulting company. He was married to cognitive psychologist and Royal Society Fellow Anne Treisman, who died in 2018.

Early life
Daniel Kahneman was born in Tel Aviv, Mandatory Palestine, in 1934, where his mother, Rachel, was visiting relatives. His parents were Lithuanian Jews who had emigrated to France in the early 1920s. He spent his childhood years in Paris. Kahneman and his family were in Paris when it was occupied by Nazi Germany in 1940. His father, Efrayim, was picked up in the first major round-up of French Jews, but he was released after six weeks due to the intervention of his employer, La Cagoule backer Eugène Schueller. The family was on the run for the remainder of the war, and survived, except for the death of Kahneman's father due to diabetes in 1944. Kahneman and his family then moved to British Mandatory Palestine in 1948, just before the creation of the state of Israel.

Kahneman has written of his experience in Nazi-occupied France, explaining in part why he entered the field of psychology:

 Israeli intellectual Yeshayahu Leibowitz, whom Kahneman describes as influential in his intellectual development, was Kahneman's chemistry teacher at Beit-Hakerem High School, and Kahneman's physiology professor at university.

Kahneman's paternal uncle was Rabbi Yosef Shlomo Kahaneman, the head of the Ponevezh Yeshiva.

Education and early career
In 1954 Kahneman received his Bachelor of Science degree, with a major in psychology and a minor in mathematics, from the Hebrew University of Jerusalem.

He served in the psychology department of the Israeli Defense Forces, and as an infantryman. One of his responsibilities was to evaluate candidates for officer's training school, and to develop tests and measures for this purpose. Kahneman describes his military service as a "very important period" in his life.

In 1958 he went to the United States to study for his PhD in Psychology at the University of California, Berkeley. His 1961 dissertation, advised by Susan Ervin, examined relations between adjectives in the semantic differential and allowed him to "engage in two of [his] favorite pursuits: the analysis of complex correlational structures and FORTRAN programming."

Academic career

Cognitive psychology
Kahneman began his academic career as a lecturer in psychology at the Hebrew University of Jerusalem in 1961. He was promoted to senior lecturer in 1966.
His early work focused on visual perception and attention. For example, his first publication in the prestigious journal Science was entitled "Pupil Diameter and Load on Memory" (Kahneman & Beatty, 1966). During this period, Kahneman was a visiting scientist at the University of Michigan (1965–66) and the Applied Psychology Research Unit in Cambridge (1968/1969, summers). He was a fellow at the Center for Cognitive Studies, and a lecturer in cognitive psychology at Harvard University in 1966/1967.

Judgment and decision-making
This period marks the beginning of Kahneman's lengthy collaboration with Amos Tversky. Together, Kahneman and Tversky published a series of seminal articles in the general field of judgment and decision-making, culminating in the publication of their prospect theory in 1979 (Kahneman & Tversky, 1979). Following this, the pair teamed with Paul Slovic to edit a compilation entitled "Judgement Under Uncertainty: Heuristics and Biases" (1982) that proved to be an important summary of their work and of other recent advances that had influenced their thinking. Kahneman was ultimately awarded the Nobel Memorial Prize in Economics in 2002 for his work on prospect theory.

In his Nobel biography Kahneman states that his collaboration with Tversky began after Kahneman had invited Tversky to give a guest lecture to one of Kahneman's seminars at Hebrew University in 1968 or 1969. Their first jointly written paper, "Belief in the Law of Small Numbers," was published in 1971 (Tversky & Kahneman, 1971). They published seven articles in peer-reviewed journals in the years 1971–1979. Aside from "Prospect Theory," the most important of these articles was "Judgment Under Uncertainty: Heuristics and Biases" (Tversky & Kahneman, 1974), which was published in the prestigious journal Science and introduced the notion of anchoring. Kahneman wrote the paper at the Van Leer Jerusalem Institute.

Kahneman left Hebrew University in 1978 to take a position at the University of British Columbia.

In 2021, Kahneman and co-authors Olivier Sibony and Cass Sunstein contributed to the field with work on unwanted variability in human judgments of the same problem, what they term 'noise'. In Noise: A Flaw in Human Judgment, they write that due to factors such as cognitive biases, group dynamics, mood, stress, fatigue, and differences in skill between assessors/decision makers/judges, judgements that should ideally be identical in fact often differ a lot. This gives rise to injustices, hazards and costs of various types. Furthermore, it does so in a way that is distinct from statistical bias and which is affected by cognitive biases but not limited to their influence. In the book, which received much press, they explain what noise is, how it can be detected and how it can be reduced – which can also reduce bias.

Behavioral economics
Kahneman and Tversky were both fellows at the Center for Advanced Study in the Behavioral Sciences at Stanford University in the academic year 1977–1978. A young economist named Richard Thaler was a visiting professor at the Stanford branch of the National Bureau of Economic Research during that same year. According to Kahneman, "[Thaler and I] soon became friends, and have ever since had a considerable influence on each other's thinking." Building on prospect theory and Kahneman and Tversky's body of work, Thaler published "Toward a Positive Theory of Consumer Choice" in 1980, a paper which Kahneman has called "the founding text of behavioral economics."

Kahneman and Tversky became heavily involved in the development of this new approach to economic theory, and their involvement in this movement had the effect of reducing the intensity and exclusivity of their earlier period of joint collaboration. According to Kahneman the collaboration 'tapered off' in the early 1980s, although they tried to revive it. Factors included Tversky receiving most of the external credit for the output of the partnership, and a reduction in the generosity with which Tversky and Kahneman interacted with each other. They would continue to publish together until the end of Tversky's life, but the period when Kahneman published almost exclusively with Tversky ended in 1983, when he published two papers with Anne Treisman, his wife since 1978.

Hedonic psychology
In the 1990s, Kahneman's research focus began to gradually shift in emphasis towards hedonic psychology. According to Kahneman and colleagues,

(This subfield is closely related to the positive psychology movement, which was steadily gaining in popularity at the time.)

It is difficult to determine precisely when Kahneman's research began to focus on hedonics, although it likely stemmed from his work on the economic notion of utility. After publishing multiple articles and chapters in all but one of the years spanning the period 1979–1986 (for a total of 23 published works in 8 years), Kahneman published exactly one chapter during the years 1987–1989. After this hiatus, articles on utility and the psychology of utility began to appear (e.g., Kahneman & Snell, 1990; Kahneman & Thaler, 1991; Kahneman & Varey, 1991).

In 1992 Varey and Kahneman introduced the method of evaluating moments and episodes as a way to capture "experiences extended across time". While Kahneman continued to study decision-making (e.g., Kahneman, 1992, 1994; Kahneman & Lovallo, 1993), hedonic psychology was the focus of an increasing number of publications (e.g., Fredrickson & Kahneman, 1993; Kahneman, Fredrickson, Schreiber & Redelemeier, 1993; Kahneman, Wakker & Sarin, 1997; Redelmeier & Kahneman, 1996), culminating in a volume co-edited with Ed Diener and Norbert Schwarz, scholars of affect and well-being.

Focusing illusion
With David Schkade, Kahneman developed the notion of the focusing illusion (Kahneman & Schkade, 1998; Kahneman, Krueger, Schkade, Schwarz & Stone, 2006) to explain in part the mistakes people make when estimating the effects of different scenarios on their future happiness (also known as affective forecasting, which has been studied extensively by Daniel Gilbert). The "illusion" occurs when people consider the impact of one specific factor on their overall happiness, they tend to greatly exaggerate the importance of that factor, while overlooking the numerous other factors that would in most cases have a greater impact.

A good example is provided by Kahneman and Schkade's 1998 paper "Does living in California make people happy? A focusing illusion in judgments of life satisfaction". In that paper, students in the Midwest and in California reported similar levels of life satisfaction, but the Midwesterners thought their Californian peers would be happier. The only distinguishing information the Midwestern students had when making these judgments was the fact that their hypothetical peers lived in California. Thus, they "focused" on this distinction, thereby overestimating the effect of the weather in California on its residents' satisfaction with life.

Peak–end rule and remembered pleasure 
One of the cognitive biases in hedonic psychology discovered by Kahneman is called the peak–end rule. It affects how we remember the pleasantness or unpleasantness of experiences. It states that our overall impression of past events is determined for the most part not by the total pleasure and suffering it contained but by how it felt at its peaks and at its end. For example, the memory of a painful colonoscopy is improved if the examination is extended by three minutes in which the scope is still inside but not moved anymore, resulting in a moderately uncomfortable sensation. This extended colonoscopy, despite involving more pain overall, is remembered less negatively due to the reduced pain at the end. This even increases the likelihood for the patient to return for subsequent procedures. Kahneman explains this distortion in terms of the difference between two selves: the experiencing self, which is aware of pleasure and pain as they are happening, and the remembering self, which shows the aggregate pleasure and pain over an extended period of time. The distortions due to the peak–end rule happen on the level of the remembering self. Our tendency to rely on the remembering self can often lead us to pursue courses of action that are not in our best self-interest.

Happiness and life satisfaction
Kahneman has defined happiness as "what I experience here and now", but says that in reality humans pursue life satisfaction, which "is connected to a large degree to social yardsticks–achieving goals, meeting expectations."

Teaching
Kahneman is a senior scholar and faculty member emeritus at Princeton University's Department of Psychology and Princeton School of Public and International Affairs. He is also a fellow at Hebrew University and a Gallup Senior Scientist.

Personal life
Kahneman's first wife was Irah Kahneman, an Israeli educational psychologist, with whom he had two children. His son has schizophrenia, and his daughter works in technology.

His second wife was the cognitive psychologist Anne Treisman, from 1978 until her death in 2018. As of 2014, they lived part-time in Berkeley, California. As of 2022, he lives in New York City with Barbara Tversky, the widow of his long-time collaborator Amos Tversky.

In 2015 Kahneman described himself as a very hard worker, as "a worrier" and "not a jolly person." But, despite this, he said, "I'm quite capable of great enjoyment, and I've had a great life."

Awards and recognition
 In 2001, he was elected a member of the National Academy of Sciences
 In 2002, Kahneman received the Nobel Memorial Prize in Economic Sciences, despite being a research psychologist, for his work in prospect theory. Kahneman states he has never taken a single economics course – that everything that he knows of the subject he and Tversky learned from their collaborators Richard Thaler and Jack Knetsch.
 Kahneman, co-recipient with Tversky, earned the 2003 University of Louisville Grawemeyer Award for Psychology.
In 2005, he was elected a member of the American Philosophical Society.
 In 2007, he was presented with the American Psychological Association's Award for Outstanding Lifetime Contributions to Psychology.
 On November 6, 2009, he was awarded an honorary doctorate from the department of Economics at Erasmus University in Rotterdam, Netherlands. In his acceptance speech Kahneman said, "when you live long enough, you see the impossible become reality." He was referring to the fact that he would never have expected to be honored as an economist when he started his studies into what would become Behavioral Economics.
 In both 2011 and 2012, he made the Bloomberg 50 most influential people in global finance.
 On November 9, 2011, he was awarded the Talcott Parsons Prize by the American Academy of Arts and Sciences.
 His book Thinking, Fast and Slow was the winner of the 2011 Los Angeles Times Book Award for Current Interest and the National Academy of Sciences Communication Award for the best book published in 2011.
 In 2012 he was accepted as corresponding academician at the Real Academia Española (Economic and Financial Sciences).
 On August 8, 2013, President Barack Obama announced that Daniel Kahneman would be a recipient of the Presidential Medal of Freedom.
 On June 1, 2015, he was awarded an honorary doctorate from the Faculty of Arts at McGill University in Montreal.
 December 2018, Kahneman was named a Gold Medal Honoree by The National Institute of Social Sciences.
 In 2019, Kahneman received the Golden Plate Award of the American Academy of Achievement.

Notable contributions

 Anchoring and adjustment
 Attribute substitution
 Availability heuristic
 Base rate fallacy
 Cognitive bias
 Conjunction fallacy
 Dictator game
 Framing (social sciences)
 Loss aversion
 Optimism bias
 Peak–end rule
 Planning fallacy
 Prospect theory
 Cumulative prospect theory
 Reference class forecasting
 Representativeness heuristic
 Simulation heuristic
 Status quo bias

Books
 
 
 
 
 
  (Reviewed by Freeman Dyson in New York Review of Books, 22 December 2011, pp. 40–44.)

Interviews
 "Can We Trust Our Intuitions?" in Alex Voorhoeve Conversations on Ethics. Oxford University Press, 2009.  (Discusses Kahneman's views about the reliability of moral intuitions [case judgments] and the relevance of his work for the search for "reflective equilibrium" in moral philosophy.)

Radio interviews
 All in the Mind, ABC, Australia (2003)
 All in the Mind, BBC, Great Britain (2011)

Online interviews
 Thinking about Thinking – An Interview with Daniel Kahneman (2011)  
 Conversation with Tyler – Daniel Kahneman on Cutting Through the Noise (2018) Daniel Kahneman on Cutting Through the Noise (Ep. 56 - Live at Mason)
 The Knowledge Project Podcast – Daniel Kahneman: Putting Your Intuition on Ice (2019) Daniel Kahneman: Putting Your Intuition on Ice
 Lex Fridman Podcast #65 – Daniel Kahneman: Thinking Fast and Slow, Deep Learning, and AI (2020) Daniel Kahneman: Thinking Fast and Slow, Deep Learning, and AI | MIT | Artificial Intelligence Podcast
The Jordan Harbinger Show #518 – Daniel Kahneman: When Noise Destroys Our Best of Choices (2021)Daniel Kahneman | When Noise Destroys Our Best of Choices

Television interviews
 How You Really Make Decisions – Horizon (BBC TV series) – Series 2013–2014 No. 9

See also
 Fooled by Randomness
 List of economists
 List of Israeli Nobel laureates
 List of Jewish Nobel laureates
 List of Nobel laureates in Economics

References

Further reading

External links
 
 
  (at Princeton)
 
 
 
  including the Nobel Lecture Maps of Bounded Rationality

1934 births
Living people
Nobel laureates in Economics
Israeli Nobel laureates
American people of Lithuanian-Jewish descent
20th-century psychologists
Behavioral economists
21st-century American psychologists
21st-century Israeli economists
20th-century Israeli economists
American cognitive psychologists
Experimental economists
Distinguished Fellows of the American Economic Association
Fellows of the American Academy of Arts and Sciences
Members of the American Philosophical Society
Fellows of the Econometric Society
Fellows of the Society of Experimental Psychologists
Framing theorists
Harvard Fellows
Hebrew University of Jerusalem alumni
Academic staff of the Hebrew University of Jerusalem
French emigrants to Mandatory Palestine
Israeli economists
Israeli emigrants to the United States
Israeli people of Lithuanian-Jewish descent
Members of the United States National Academy of Sciences
People from Tel Aviv
Positive psychologists
Princeton University faculty
Academic staff of the University of British Columbia
University of California, Berkeley alumni
University of Michigan faculty
Presidential Medal of Freedom recipients
Fellows of the Cognitive Science Society
Center for Advanced Study in the Behavioral Sciences fellows
Russell Sage Foundation
Nancy L. Schwartz Memorial Lecture speakers
Corresponding Fellows of the British Academy